Shifana Ali (born 6 June 1984) is a Maldivian sprinter. She competed in the women's 400 metres at the 2004 Summer Olympics.

References

External links

1984 births
Living people
Athletes (track and field) at the 2004 Summer Olympics
Maldivian female sprinters
Olympic athletes of the Maldives
Olympic female sprinters